Konishi (written: 小西) is a Japanese surname. Notable people with the surname include:

, Japanese ice hockey player
, Japanese physicist
, Japanese voice actress
, Japanese ukiyo-e artist
, Japanese gymnast
Hokuto Konishi (born 1984), Japanese-born British dancer
, Japanese voice actor
, Japanese field hockey player
, Japanese actress
, Japanese neurobiologist
, Japanese actress
Nagako Konishi (born 1945), Japanese composer
, Japanese actor and voice actor
, Japanese racewalker
Sadaaki Konishi, Imperial Japanese Army officer
Takako Konishi (office worker) (died 2001), Japanese office worker and suicide victim
Takako Konishi (synchronized swimmer) (born 1986), Japanese synchronized swimmer
, Japanese baseball player and coach
Toshiro Konishi (1953–2016), Japanese-Peruvian chef, musician and television personality
, Japanese musician, composer and DJ
, Japanese karateka
, Japanese fashion designer
Yukari Konishi, Japanese sport shooter
, Japanese daimyō
, Japanese footballer
, Japanese hurdler

See also
Konishi anomaly, a physics anomaly

Japanese-language surnames